Eviota sigillata, commonly called seven-figure pygmy goby or adorned dwarfgoby, is a species of marine fish in the family Gobiidae. They are widespread throughout the tropical waters of the Indo-West Pacific area, from the Seychelles to the Micronesia.

This species has the shortest lifespan for a vertebrate, living for at most 59 days. About three weeks are as pelagic larvae, two weeks settling on the reef and three weeks as adults.

See also

 Pandaka pygmaea

References

 
 Depczynski M, Bellwood DR (2005) Shortest recorded vertebrate lifespan found in a coral reef fish. Current Biology Vol 15 (8): R288-R289.

External links 
  Fish is shortest-lived vertebrate
http://www.marinespecies.org/aphia.php?p=taxdetails&id=219453
 

sigillata
Taxa named by Susan L. Jewett
Taxa named by Ernest A. Lachner
Fish described in 1983